Aircraft engines produced by the People's Republic of China. Most of the engines listed are produced by the Aero Engine Corporation of China (AECC).

Piston engines

Turboprop engines

Turboshaft engines

Turbojet engines

Turbofan engines

Turbofan engines (High bypass)

See also 
 Aero Engine Corporation of China

References

 
China
Engines